John or Jack Davenport may refer to:

Sports
 Jack A. Davenport (1931–1951), boxer
 John Davenport (rally driver), co-winner of the 1968 RAC Rally and British Leyland's Director of Motorsport from the end of 1976.
 John Davenport (baseball), born 1922, American baseball player in 1954 New York Giants (MLB) season

Politicians
 John Davenport (Connecticut politician) (1752–1830), U.S. Representative from Connecticut, 1799–1816
 John Davenport (industrialist) (1765–1848), British pottery manufacturer and member of parliament for Stoke-upon-Trent, 1832–1841
 John Davenport (Ohio politician) (1788–1855), U.S. Representative from Ohio, 1827–1828

Actors
 Jack Davenport (born 1973), British actor

Others
 John Davenport (minister) (1597–1670), Puritan minister and colonist in New Haven Colony
 John Davenport (orientalist) (1789–1877), British orientalist scholar
 John Davenport (trade unionist) (died 1941), British trade unionist
 Otis Blackwell (1932–2002), musician who used the pseudonym John Davenport
 John M. Davenport (1842–1913), Church of England clergyman and writer
 John Thistlewood Davenport (1817–1901), English pharmacist and businessman
 John Davenport (economic journalist) (1904–1987)
 John Davenport (journalist), former host of Washington Week
 John Davenport (critic) (1908–1966), British poet and critic

See also
 John Davenport Siddeley, 1st Baron Kenilworth (1866–1956), automobile pioneer